Punjabi Christians are adherents of Christianity who identify linguistically, culturally, and genealogically as Punjabis. They are one of the four main ethnoreligious communities of the historical Punjab region of the Indian subcontinent—split between India and Pakistan since 1947—with the others being Punjabi Muslims, Punjabi Sikhs and Punjabi Hindus. Punjabi Christians are traditionally divided into various castes, and are largely descendants of Hindus who converted to Christianity during European colonial India, with the majority having converted during the British Raj.

Today, the majority of Punjabi Christians reside in Pakistan, and are almost equally divided between Catholicism and Protestantism. With an estimated three million living in the Pakistani province of Punjab, they account for 75 percent of the country's total Christian population. They are the second-largest religious community in the province behind Muslims, comprising approximately 1.5 to 2.8 percent of its population. Outside of Pakistan, a significant Punjabi Christian community is also found in the Indian state of Punjab. With a population of roughly 350,000, they comprise 1.26 percent of the state's population according to official Indian government figures. However the actual figure is around 2 percent of the total population of Punjab.

History

From the mid-19th to early 20th centuries, a number of Christian texts were translated and made widely available in the Punjabi language, such as the New Testament, the Gospel, and texts relating to Jesus. Ninety-five percent of Punjabi Christians are converts to Christianity from Hinduism, accepting their new faith during the British Raj in colonial India. By 1870, there were only a few thousand Christians in the Punjab Province of colonial India; the 1880s saw the growth of the Presbyterian Church from 660 to 10,615 baptized Christians. Continued evangelism efforts by Christian missionaries, especially those from the Church of Scotland and Church Missionary Society in India led to nearly half a million Punjabi Christians by the 1930s. In the Gujranwala, Sialkot and Sheikhupura districts of the Punjab Province in colonial India, Christians came to constitute 7% of the total population.

The All India Conference of Indian Christians held its first meeting on 28 December 1914 and was led by Raja Sir Harnam Singh of Kapurthala, who was the president of the National Missionary Society (NMS); the first AICIC General Secretary was B.L. Rallia Ram of Lahore. The meeting of the All India Conference of Indian Christians in Lahore in December 1922, which had a large attendance of Punjabis, resolved that the clergymen of the Church in India should be drawn from the ranks of Indians, rather than foreigners. The AICIC also stated that Indian Christians would not tolerate any discrimination based on race or skin colour. S. K. Datta of Lahore, who served as the principal of Forman Christian College in then colonial India, became the president of the All India Conference of Indian Christians, representing the Indian Christian community at the Second Round Table Conference, where he agreed with Mahatma Gandhi's views on minorities and Depressed Classes.

In June 1947, the total population of Punjabi Christians in the Punjab Province of colonial India was recorded at 511,299. Of these, 450,344 were based in West Punjab and 60,955 were in East Punjab. After the partition of British India, most Punjabi Christians remained in place, with the majority finding themselves within the borders of Pakistan and the rest in independent India. Those Christians who were serving in official government positions and the civil service were given the choice of opting for either of the countries. The many British-era churches and cathedrals dotting the various cities of Punjab were overtaken by Punjabi Christians, and they also continued the legacy of maintaining Christian educational institutions and healthcare facilities which had remained nationally renowned.

Culture

According to Selva J. Raj, the Punjabi Christian identity is an amalgamation of the Christian faith along with an ethnic affinity for the culture of Punjab, which includes the Punjabi language, Punjabi cuisine, the various customs and traditions of Punjab, and the way of life of the Punjabi people in general. 

As a result of living close to Punjabis of other faiths for generations, there have been notable cross-cultural influences; the Urdu language for instance, partly due to its evolution under Muslim presence in Punjab and otherwise due to its official adoption by the British Raj later on, features heavily in the theology and literature of Punjabi Christians. The earliest Christian scriptures which were published by British missionaries in the Punjab included those written in Roman Urdu.

Geographical distribution

Pakistan

As of 1981, Lahore was the city with the largest Christian population in Pakistan, numbering over 200,000. The cities of Faisalabad, Sialkot and Sheikhupura are home to sizable communities. In rural Punjab, many Christians belong to the Dalit Christian community, specifically the chuhra community, whose ancestors had converted to Christianity from Hinduism during the colonial era to escape a discriminatory caste system in which they were regarded untouchables. According to Dawn, compared to the more affluent Pakistani Christian communities of Anglo-Indians and Goan Catholics, who at the time of independence lived in the major cities, were proficient in English, and maintained upper-class British cultural mannerisms, the chuhras reflected the lower socioeconomic end of Pakistan; they were predominately labourers and peasants who were unskilled, did not own land, were neither highly educated or wealthy, and lived in the villages of central Punjab. Despite having embraced Christianity, they still faced discrimination at some level due to their caste, skin color, and economic status. Peter C. Phan states that these chuhras form the vast majority of Pakistani Christians. There continue to be several Christian-majority villages and settlements throughout Pakistani Punjab, such as Clarkabad and Martinpur. The Christians belonging to the lower-income strata of Pakistani society face a number of social and economic issues, such as bonded labour. Because of their impoverishment, many of them are forced to work in menial labour jobs, such as cleaners and sweepers; in Punjab alone, an estimated 80 percent of all sanitation workers belong to the Christian community. As a result of urbanisation, employment-driven migration into larger cities and greater educational opportunities, an increasing number of Punjabi Christians have been able to gain a college education and acquire socially respectable positions in recent times.

In the Islamabad Capital Territory, the Christian community dwells in large numbers in Francis Colony, a legally-recognised residential area situated in sector F-7. Others live in slums (katchi abadis) located on government-owned land, to where they have shifted from Narowal, Shakargarh, Sheikhupura, Kasur, Faisalabad, Sahiwal and Sialkot in Punjab. In Azad Kashmir, there are close to 5,000 Punjabi Christians who live in the Bhimber, Mirpur, Muzaffarabad, Kotli, Poonch and Bagh districts. Their roots lie mostly in Rawalpindi and Sialkot. Most of the 50,000 or so Christians in Khyber Pakhtunkhwa speak Punjabi, and had ancestors who settled in this area, but have gradually become Pashtunized over time due to cultural assimilation. The largest Christian population is in Peshawar, and there are a few hundred Christians in Swat. The districts forming the erstwhile tribal areas along the Afghan frontier have been home to thousands of Christians since the early 20th century; according to the 1998 census, there were 1,500 Christians in South Waziristan, 2,000 in North Waziristan, 500 in Bajaur, 700 in Mohmand and 1,500 in Khyber District, all of whose ancestors migrated from Punjab. They primarily work in nursing, teaching, cleaning or in clerical jobs. 

In Sindh, there have been Punjabi Christians settled for several decades; they include farmers, landowners, agricultural workers and other labourers engaged in blue collar work in the rural countryside, with Catholic villages existing in Hyderabad, Nawabshah, Sanghar and Mirpur Khas. The metropolis of Karachi is home to the largest population, with over 20,000 Punjabi Christians living in the neighbourhood of Essa Nagri alone. In Balochistan, the majority of the province's 80,000 to 100,000 Christians are Punjabis.

In Gilgit-Baltistan, Christians from Punjab are present across all of the ten districts, and are involved in janitorial work in both the public and private sectors.

India

In India, the majority of Punjabi Christians belong to the Dalit community of chuhras and belong to the lower-income working class. At just over one percent of Punjab's population, their main population centres include the Gurdaspur, Amritsar, Firozpur, Jalandhar and Ludhiana districts. There have historically been Punjabi Christian communities in Jammu, Delhi, and in Chandigarh, where the Christians are also known as Isai and belong to various sects. The Punjabi Christians in Chandigarh often bear the surname Masih. Likewise in Haryana, some of the Christians settled there are Punjabis and are also commonly referred to as the Isai. Both Chandigarh and Haryana were a part of Punjab up until 1966, when they were carved out as a separate union territory and state respectively.

Diaspora
As a result of immigration, a large Christian Punjabi diaspora exists today. There are significant Punjabi Christian communities in Canada (particularly Toronto), the United States (particularly Philadelphia), the Middle East, the United Kingdom, as well as other parts of Europe and Australia. In the UK, Christian Punjabis are concentrated in the cities of London, Bedford, Birmingham, Coventry, Oxford and Wolverhampton among others. One of the most prominent early Punjabi Christians in the UK was Duleep Singh, who first landed in the country in 1854, he was the Sikh Prince kidnapped by British at young age and converted without his knowing. He left Christianity at a later age and converted back to his Sikh beliefs. 

Some who have sought to resettle in the West arrived in Thailand, Sri Lanka and Malaysia as their first destinations, where they filed applications with the UNHCR. Many individuals fled due to unfavorable conditions for Christians in Pakistan, resulting in concerns that such a haphazard diaspora led to irregular immigration and sex trafficking in areas such as China. Among other motives for emigration, Christians have left Pakistan for economic reasons, greater opportunities to attain higher education or theological training, desire to join relatives already settled abroad, and to escape religious discrimination/persecution.

List of people
Nikki Haley (Nimrata Randhawa), American politician
Bobby Jindal, American politician
Brother Bakht Singh, South Asian evangelist
Gurmit Singh (half Punjabi), Siganporean actor-singer
Sadhu Sundar Singh, Indian Christian missionary
Jasvinder Sanghera, British activist
Mohammad Yousuf (Yousuf Youhana), former captain of Pakistan national cricket team. He was born as Christian but converted into Islam.
Sunita Marshall, Pakistani model & T.V actress
Nirmal Roy, Pakistani singer
Bohemia (David Roger), first Punjabi rapper
Sidra Sadaf, Pakistani cyclist
Shazia Hidayat, Pakistani track and field athlete
Michael Masih, Pakistani footballer
Rakesh Masih, Indiam footballer
Naeem Masih, Pakistano para athlete
Cecil Chaudhry, Pakistani academic, human rights activist, and veteran fighter pilot
Peter Christy, former Pakistani air force officer
Nazir Latif, former Pakistani air force officer
Julian Peter, former Major General in Pakistan Army
Samuel Martin Burke, Pakistani diplomat, author and professor
Shahbaz Bhatti, first Federal Minister for Minorities Affairs & member of National Assembly of Pakistan
Anthony Theodore Lobo, former mimister of Pakistan Roman Catholic Church
Lawrence Saldanha, catholic bishop
Rev. Samuel Azariah, Pakistani bishop
Dewan Bahadur Singha (half Punjabi), Pakistani politician and Speaker of Punjab Assembly
Akram Masih Gill, Pakistani politician
Bir Masih Saunta, Indian politician & G.S of Punjab Pradesh Congress Committee(Minority Dept.)
Iqbal Masih, Pakistani boy who became a symbol of abusive child labour
Shazia Masih, Pakistani torture victim

See also

History of Punjab
 Christianity in Pakistan
 Christianity in India

References

Further reading
 

Christian communities of India
Christian communities of Pakistan
Christianity in Punjab, India
Christianity in Punjab, Pakistan